Przyrowa may refer to the following places:
Przyrowa, Tuchola County in Kuyavian-Pomeranian Voivodeship (north-central Poland)
Przyrowa, Rypin County in Kuyavian-Pomeranian Voivodeship (north-central Poland)
Przyrowa, Masovian Voivodeship (east-central Poland)